Osona is a comarca situated in Catalonia, Northeast Spain. Its capital is Vic. Its population in 2001 was 129,543. Osona covers roughly the same area as the historic Catalan county of Osona. The name Osona comes from Ausetans, a group of Iberian people who had their capital in Ausa (today Vic); the Romans called the area Ausone or Ausona. While most of the comarca is within the province of Barcelona, the municipalities of Espinelves, Vidrà and Viladrau form part of the province of Girona.

The most important town of Osona is Vic, its capital and an important and ancient urban center in this natural region that lies in the midst of the Plain of Vic. Other significant towns in the plain are Manlleu and Tona.

This natural depression in the center of the region was carved by river Ter and its tributaries and makes up a big part of Osona's land. It is surrounded by mountains: The Sub-Pyrenees, with Bellmunt mountain towering in the north, the Lluçanès (Pre-Pyrenees) to the north-west and Moianès high plateau in the West, the Montseny in the southeast and the Guilleries, located at the apex of the Catalan Transversal Range and the Pre-Coastal Range, in the east. 

Long famous for its local sausages (especially fuet) and other pork derivatives, in recent years the area has become somewhat infamous for the pollution of its many waterways due to the factory farming of pigs and Dairy cattle. There are more pigs than people living in Osona. 

In the comarcal revision of 1990, Sant Quirze de Besora became part of Osona; previously it formed part of the Ripollès. In May 2015, Osona lost the municipality of Collsuspina to the new comarca of Moianès.

Municipalities

See also
County of Osona (ancient county)
Patronat d'Estudis Osonencs
Plain of Vic
Sub-Pyrenees

References

External links  
Official comarcal web site (in Catalan) 
Information about Osona from the Generalitat de Catalunya (in Catalan)

 
Comarques of the Province of Barcelona